Wels (Central Bavarian: Wös) is a city in Upper Austria, on the Traun River near Linz. It is the county seat of Wels-Land, and with a population of approximately 60,000, the eighth largest city in Austria.

Geography 

The town comprises the following boroughs: Aichberg, Au, Berg, Brandln, Dickerldorf, Doppelgraben, Eben, Gaßl, Höllwiesen, Hölzl, Kirchham, Laahen, Lichtenegg, Mitterlaab, Nöham, Niederthan, Oberhaid, Oberhart, Oberlaab, Oberthan, Pernau, Puchberg, Roithen, Rosenau, Schafwiesen, Stadlhof, Trausenegg, Unterleithen, Waidhausen, Wels, Wimpassing, Wispl.

History

Prehistoric 

The area of Wels has been settled since the Neolithic era (between 3500 and 1700 B.C.E.), as evidenced by archaeological finds of simple tools, especially from around the banks of the Traun River in what is now the city center.

A Bronze Age (after 1700 B.C.E.) cemetery was found in the area of the current airport and dated to the time of the Urnfield Culture (1100–750 B.C.E.). It contained 60 graves with such items as bronze jewelry and food.

Swords from the Halstatt Period (750–400 B.C.E.) have been found in the area of Pernau.

During the Iron Age La Tène Culture (up to 100 B.C.E.) Celts inhabited the area, leaving behind gold coins, swords, earthenware and iron brooches. The name "Traun" comes from this time, and it is possible the "Wels" is similarly of Celtic origin.  The name "Wels" could be Celtic for "Settlement on the bend of the Traun River".

Roman Era
Wels gained importance in Roman times because of its central location in the province of Noricum. Around the year 120, Wels received Roman city rights under the name of Municipium Ovilava. The enclosed built-up area by the Traun River was at the present level of Kaiser-Josef-Platz. There were brick houses, a bath, an arena and an irrigation system of pure mountain water brought from beyond the Traun.

Around 215, during the reign of Emperor Caracalla, it was renamed Colonia Aurelia Antoniana Ovilabis and given colonia status. At this time, the city had around 18,000 inhabitants.

Due to the impending threat of the Alemanni, the city was surrounded by a city wall that enclosed an area of about 90 hectares and a road was built along the Danube to Passau. It is known that six towers with gates were integrated into the walls, controlling entrances from along the western road, towards the Traun, and to the fields beyond the city.

As part of his reforms Emperor Diocletian made Ovilava the capital city of the province of Noricum Ripensis. It was governed by two duumviri who served as municipal judges, two aediles, who advocated compliance with the laws and market rights, a quaestor, who managed the city treasury, and a 100-member city council.

Ovilava administered an area enclosed by the Inn and Danube, from Lauriacum (Enns) in the east to submitted to Bad Ischl in the west. In this area are included the border fortifications, Linz (Lentia) and Passau (Boiodurum), as well as numerous settlements in what are now the regions of Upper Austria and Salzburg.

During the early migration period (3rd, 4th and 5th century), the area around Ovilava was often invaded by the Alamanni, Vandals and other Germanic tribes as well as by Attila's army. During the time of the Emperor Gallienus the province of Noricum was described as “devastated”. By the time of Odoacer, the first Germanic King of Italy, Noricum was described as “vacant”. From the 4th century onward, it is likely that Wels was again a small and insignificant village for several centuries.

The economy of Roman Wels

Agriculture and regional trade formed the basis for the economy of Ovilava.  While most agriculture was subsistence level, cows and horses were produced in large enough numbers to be exported.  The oldest granary in the Eastern Alps has been discovered in Wels, which housed diverse grains such as wheat, dwarf wheat, emmer wheat, barley and rye. There was additionally a significant brick and pottery works as well as mines for construction stone.

Due to its situation at an important crossing of several Roman roads, both east-to-west and to the south, archeology reveals a large number of objects manufactured in other areas of the empire, such as Terra Sigillata pottery and statuettes (such as the "Venus of Wels") from Gaul and Germania Inferior, as well as oyster shells and coins from Italy.

Middle Ages

Wels served as a minor trading centre during the Middle Ages. In 943, the Hungarians were defeated by the Bavarians and Carantanians at the Battle of Wels. In 1222, during the rule of the Babenberger family, Wels again received city rights. A document dating to 1328 provides evidence for Wels' important role as the location of a market. Its endowment with economic privileges, and its advantageous position on several rivers allowed it to gain an important position in the region.

Emperor Maximilian I died in Wels on January 12, 1519, after having been denied access to Innsbruck by its citizens.

20th century

During World War II, a subcamp of Mauthausen concentration camp was located here.

On 18 January 1964, Wels became a Statutarstadt of Austria.

Population

Economy

There are about 36,000 people employed in Wels. Of that, about 63% are in the service sector. Wels is known as an important city for shopping and the location of several gymnasiums (academic secondary schools) and higher vocational schools and also of a vocational college. Furthermore, it is famous for the Wels Fair, which takes place every year in autumn and spring.

Notable residents

 Alois Auer (1813–1869), printer
 Karin Hannak (born 1940), artist
 Josef Friedrich Doppelbauer (1918–1989), composer
 Thomas Steiner (born 1956), film director
 Julius Wagner-Jauregg (1857–1940), physician, Nobel Prize 1927
 Franz Welser-Möst (born 1960), conductor
 Hugo Gerard Ströhl (1851–1919), heraldist
 Carl Rabl (1853–1917), physician and anatomist
 Grete Hinterhofer (1899–1985), classical pianist and composer was born in Wels
 Thomas Christian David (1925–2006), composer and performer
 Werner Kreindl (1927–1992), television actor
 Manfred Buchroithner (born 1950), cartographer, geologist and professor
 Paul Rübig (born 1953), politician (ÖVP), member of the European Parliament
 Christoph Ransmayr (born 1954), writer
Rudolf Anschober (born 1960), Austrian politician
 Stefan Sonvilla-Weiss (born 1961), communication scientist and arts and media educator
 Götz Spielmann (born 1961), film director and screenwriter
 Sabine Derflinger (born 1963), director, writer, producer and dramaturgical consultant
 Norbert Trawöger (born 1971), flautist and artistic director
 Christian Mayrleb (born 1972), football player, national player and top scorer in the top division in Austria
 Johannes Wipplinger (born 1978), athlete and bobsledder
 Helge Payer (born 1979), football goalkeeper 
 Emin Sulimani (born 1986), football player
 Robert Žulj (born 1992), football player
 Kevin Wimmer (born 1992), football player 
 Felix Großschartner (born 1993), cyclist
 Karl Ridderbusch (born 1932), operatic bass

See also

FC Wels
Wels Airport
Trodat
TGW Logistics Group
Wels-Land

References

External links

 (in German): http://www.wels.at

 
Cities and towns in Upper Austria